The 1973 NCAA Division I men's ice hockey tournament was the culmination of the 1972–73 NCAA Division I men's ice hockey season, the 26th such tournament in NCAA history. It was held between March 15 and 17, 1973, and concluded with Wisconsin defeating Denver 4-2. All games were played at the Boston Garden in Boston, Massachusetts.

After the tournament Denver's participation was vacated as a result of NCAA recruiting violations.

Qualifying teams
Four teams qualified for the tournament, two each from the eastern and western regions. The ECAC tournament champion and the two WCHA tournament co-champions received automatic bids into the tournament. An at-large bid was offered to a second eastern team based upon both their ECAC tournament finish as well as their regular season record.

Format
The ECAC champion was seeded as the top eastern team while the WCHA co-champion with the better regular season record was given the top western seed. The second eastern seed was slotted to play the top western seed and vice versa. All games were played at the Boston Garden. All matches were single-game eliminations with the semifinal winners advancing to the national championship game and the losers playing in a consolation game.

Tournament bracket

Note: * denotes overtime period(s)Note: † Denver's participation was later vacated due to NCAA violations

Semifinals

(W1) Denver vs. (E2) Boston College

(E1) Cornell vs. (W2) Wisconsin

Consolation Game

(E1) Cornell vs. (E2) Boston College

National Championship

(W1) Denver vs. (W2) Wisconsin

All-Tournament Team
G: Jim Makey (Wisconsin)
D: vacated†
D: John Taft (Wisconsin)
F: Stan Hinkley (Wisconsin)
F: vacated†
F: Dean Talafous* (Wisconsin)
* Most Outstanding Player(s)
† Recognition of Denver's D: Bruce Affleck and F: Peter McNab was vacated when Denver's participation in the tournament was vacated

References

Tournament
NCAA Division I men's ice hockey tournament
NCAA University Division Men's Ice Hockey Tournament
NCAA University Division Men's Ice Hockey Tournament
NCAA University Division Men's Ice Hockey Tournament
Ice hockey competitions in Boston